WFTH (1590 AM) is a non-commercial radio station licensed to Richmond, Virginia, and serving the Greater Richmond Region.  WFTH is owned and operated by Stu-Comm, Inc.  It airs an adult album alternative radio format, simulcasting sister station WNRN in Charlottesville, Virginia.  WFTH is listener supported, with on-air fundraisers held throughout the year.

WFTH broadcasts in the daytime at 5,000 watts, using a non-directional antenna. The station decreases power to 24 watts at night to protect others on the same frequency. 1590 AM is a regional broadcast frequency.

Programming is also heard on FM translator station W203CB at 88.5 MHz, which has a power of 170 watts.

History
In December 1958, the station signed on as WEZL. The station was originally a daytimer, required to sign-off at sunset. In 1964, it was purchased by Richard S. Reynolds III and future Lieutenant Governor of Virginia J. Sargeant Reynolds. As WGOE, the station was first a top-40 outlet. It later became locally famous for airing a progressive rock format, which was typically the domain of FM radio, during the 1970s.

In 1982, the station was bought by the Willis Broadcasting Corporation.  Owner L.E. Willis Sr. changed the call sign to WFTH to represent the word "faith."  The format was switched to black gospel music and preaching shows.

In May 2016, the station was leased to Stu-Comm, Inc., owner of non-commercial FM 91.9 WNRN in Charlottesville, Virginia. WFTH was sold to Stu-Comm the next month. Stu-Comm's goal was to take advantage of the Federal Communications Commission's "AM revitalization" program, which allows owners of eligible AM stations to purchase and move in FM translators from up to 250 miles away. A facility was brought in from Harrisville, West Virginia, which is now on the air as W203CB. This translator replaces WNRN's previous signal in the area, W276BZ (103.1 FM), which broadcast at just 10 watts and drew listener complaints due to its poor coverage of the city.

Translator
In addition to the main station, WFTH is relayed by one FM translator to widen its broadcast area.

References

External links
 91-9 WNRN Online

1964 establishments in Virginia
Radio stations established in 1964
FTH
NPR member stations